Events from the year 1456 in Ireland.

Incumbent
Lord: Henry VI

Events

Births
 Gerald FitzGerald, 8th Earl of Kildare

References